Central New Mexico is the central region of the state of New Mexico.  In the center of this region is Albuquerque, New Mexico, the largest city in the state.

Communities 
The top seven largest cities in Central New Mexico are:

 Albuquerque
 Rio Rancho
 Los Lunas
 Bernalillo
 Socorro
 Corrales
 Belen

External links 
 
 New Mexico Tourism Department Website for Central New Mexico

Regions of New Mexico